WPCH-TV (channel 17), branded on-air as Peachtree TV, is an independent television station in Atlanta, Georgia, United States. It is owned by locally based Gray Television alongside CBS affiliate and company flagship WANF (channel 46), and low-power, Class A Telemundo affiliate WKTB-CD (channel 47). WPCH-TV and WANF share studios on 14th Street Northwest in Atlanta's Atlantic Station district, while WPCH-TV's transmitter is located in the Woodland Hills section of northeastern Atlanta.

During its ownership under the Turner Broadcasting System (which owned the station from April 1970 until February 2017), WPCH-TV—then using the WTCG call letters—pioneered the distribution of broadcast television stations retransmitted by communications satellite to cable and satellite subscribers throughout the United States, expanding the small independent station into the first national "superstation" on December 17, 1976. (The station eventually became among the first four American superstations to begin being distributed to television providers in Canada in 1985.)

The former superstation feed—which eventually became known as simply TBS, and had maintained a nearly identical program schedule as the local Atlanta feed—was converted by Turner into a conventional basic cable network on October 1, 2007, at which time it was concurrently added to cable providers within the Atlanta market (including Comcast and Charter) alongside its existing local carriage on satellite providers DirecTV and Dish Network. Channel 17—which had used the WTBS callsign since 1979—was concurrently relaunched as WPCH and reformatted as a traditional independent station with a separate schedule exclusively catering to the Atlanta market. Although the Atlanta station is no longer carried on American multichannel television providers outside of its home market, WPCH-TV continues to be available as a de facto superstation on most Canadian cable and satellite providers.

History

As WJRJ-TV
On October 20, 1965, Rice Broadcasting Inc.—owned by Atlanta entrepreneur Jack M. Rice, Jr., owner of locally based pay television firms Atlanta Telemeter Inc. and Home Theaters of Georgia Inc.—filed a permit application with the Federal Communications Commission (FCC) to be the holder of the construction permit to build and license to operate a new television station on UHF channel 46, the third commercial UHF allocation to be assigned to Atlanta. The FCC granted the permit to Rice Broadcasting on October 20, 1965. In January 1966, Rice Broadcasting chose to assign WJRJ-TV—named for Jack Rice, Jr.—as the call letters for its television station. On February 21, 1966, Rice subsequently filed to modify the permit to re-allocate the proposed station to UHF channel 17; the FCC granted the frequency reallocation to channel 17 five weeks later on March 31. (The UHF 46 channel allocation would eventually be assigned to the Continental Broadcasting Network arm of the Christian Broadcasting Network, which signed on WHAE-TV [now CBS-affiliated sister station WANF] over that frequency on June 6, 1971.)

Channel 17 first signed on the air on September 1, 1967. WJRJ-TV was the first commercial television station to sign on in the Atlanta market since the short-lived WQXI-TV (channel 36, allocation now occupied by MyNetworkTV affiliate WATL) signed on 13 years earlier on December 18, 1954; it was also the second independent station to begin operation in the market—the first since WQXI-TV ceased operations on May 31, 1955—even though, on paper, had a large enough population to provide suitable viewership for an independent station since the mid-1960s, as well as one of the first independents to sign on in the Southeastern United States. The station's original studio and transmitter facility was located at 1018 West Peachtree Street Northwest, which had formerly served as the studios of then-CBS affiliate WAGA-TV (channel 5, now a Fox owned-and-operated station). At , the tower near the Peachtree Street studio building became the third-tallest free-standing broadcast transmission tower in the United States at that time.

WJRJ was launched on a shoestring budget, with an afternoon and evening schedule—running from 4:00 to 11:00 p.m.—filled with older movies and a few off-network reruns (such as Father Knows Best, The Danny Thomas Show, The Adventures of Ozzie and Harriet and The Rifleman), as well as a 15-minute-long news program. In addition to placing daily ads in the Atlanta Journal-Constitutions television listings page, WJRJ-TV ran exactly one TV Guide advertisement: a half-page ad in a September 1967 issue of the magazine's Georgia edition with the headline, "Yes, Atlanta, there is a channel 17." Despite the fact that WJRJ had billed itself as "Good-looking Channel 17," technical snafus were the norm during the station's early months: film broke down, station identification, advertising and program promotion slides frequently appeared backwards, and there were often long pauses when nothing appeared on screen. The station did carry a top-rated show for a few weeks: WAGA-TV preempted CBS network programming to run a movie on Wednesday nights, and channel 17 stepped in to run the drama series Medical Center for a time. On June 5, 1968, Rice requested to transfer majority control of the station (reducing his interest from 53.9% to 46.68%) to Rice Broadcasting president W. R. McKinsey via stock delivery through conversion of 130,000 shares in debentures at $4.75 per share; the FCC granted the transfer on September 5.

Arrival of Ted Turner
In July 1969, Rice Broadcasting announced an agreement to merge with the Turner Communications Corporation—an Atlanta-based group owned by entrepreneur Robert E. "Ted" Turner III, who ran the billboard advertising business founded by his deceased father and had also owned radio stations in Chattanooga, Tennessee (WGOW); Charleston, South Carolina (WTMA-AM-FM, the FM station is now WSSX-FM); and Jacksonville, Florida (WMBR, now WQOP)—in an all-stock transaction. Under the terms of the deal, Rice would acquire Turner in an exchange of stock and adopt the Turner Communications name; however, Turner would acquire about 75% of the merged company and own 48.2% of its stock, receiving 1.2 million shares of Rice stock worth an estimated $3 million. The FCC granted approval of the acquisition on December 10, 1969, giving Turner its first television property. In January 1970, soon after Turner received approval of its purchase of the low-rated UHF outlet, Turner changed the station's call letters to WTCG, which reportedly stood for "Watch This Channel Grow" (though the "TCG" officially stood for Turner Communications Group). The sale was formally completed four months later on April 6, at which time Turner was assigned as licensee of WJRJ-TV.

Upon becoming owned by Turner, WTCG initially retained its original programming format. It also moved its operations in 1980 to new studio facilities located a few blocks west of the original Peachtree Street facility, to the former site of the Progressive Club. During an interview in 2004, Turner revealed that some of the problems that had dogged WJRJ were present during the early days at WTCG. First, when Turner bought the station, it was the only one in the Atlanta market that was still broadcasting exclusively in black-and-white because the previous owners had not made the necessary technical upgrades to allow the transmission of color programming. (The station decided to purchase the color broadcasting equipment it needed on credit after Turner took over, and began transmitting programs in color by May 1970.) Secondly, money was still very tight during the first couple of years that Turner owned the station. However, some months had passed and Turner found himself unable to make the payments on the equipment. As a last resort (after unsuccessfully attempting to secure further financing), Turner held an on-air telethon—much in the manner of the pledge drives seen on public television—to raise the money needed to pay the station's bills. Third, as it began operations in 1970, there was new competition in the form of upstart UHF station WATL (which signed on the air on August 16, 1969, as the second television station in Atlanta to occupy the channel 36 allocation). Once the financial problems were settled, WTCG eventually drove WATL off the air in April 1971, as channel 17 (as well as the economic climate of the period) ate significantly into that station's advertising revenue; channel 36 would remain dark for five years and never became a major player until it became the market's original Fox station in October 1986.

WTCG threw an on-air party in celebration, but it would soon have a new competitor when WHAE-TV took to the air on channel 46 in June 1971; that station originally maintained a six-hour-a-day program schedule, with Christian programs filling four hours of its schedule and low-budget secular shows filling the remaining airtime. Channel 46 gradually expanded its broadcast day, running programs for 20 hours daily by 1976. By 1974, the station had a conventional general entertainment format, with religious programs mixed in among its secular shows during morning and prime time slots (such as CBN's flagship program, The 700 Club). WHAE (which became WANX-TV in 1977) was a very competitive station, but could not beat WTCG, which remained the leading independent in Atlanta.

Turner had a low budget in terms of programming purchases, and would bid very low on new shows offered in syndication; network-affiliated stations WAGA-TV, WSB-TV (channel 2) and WXIA-TV (channel 11) would get the best product. But due to network commitments, the three major affiliates could keep programs for only a few years at a time. Turner would then buy the rights to the shows that the major affiliates did not renew for nearly half the price of the original purchase. Turner also bought most of the movie packages in this manner. The station's schedule placed an emphasis on its movie library; one notable program was Academy Award Theatre (eventually renamed TBS Award Theater), which showcased films that had won or have been nominated for Academy Awards. Classic films from the 1930s through the 1950s (mostly consisting of Warner Bros. releases) were shown every day as part of the regular schedule. Many older films that had either never been telecast in the Atlanta area (such as 1935's A Midsummer Night's Dream) or had not been seen on television for a long time, made their local television debut or "comeback" on WTCG.

Channel 17's sports programming grew to include game telecasts from the Atlanta Braves, Atlanta Hawks and Atlanta Flames, as well as Georgia Championship Wrestling, one of the roots of the later World Championship Wrestling (WCW). The sports and wrestling would become foundation blocks during the early satellite years (see below). Programs carried by WTCG during the period included a mix of sitcoms (such as I Love Lucy, The Andy Griffith Show, The Beverly Hillbillies and Three Stooges shorts), cartoons (such as The Flintstones and Looney Tunes/Merrie Melodies cartoons released prior to 1948) and drama series (such as Star Trek). Another show on WTCG's lineup was Future Shock, a music program hosted by R&B singer James Brown. The show, which bore similarities to American Bandstand and Soul Train, aired in late night each Friday from 1976 to 1979.

First "Superstation"

Beginning in the early 1970s, many cable systems in middle and southern Georgia and surrounding states—namely Alabama, Tennessee and South Carolina—began receiving the WTCG signal via microwave relay, enabling the station to reach far beyond the Atlanta television market. By June 1976, the WTCG signal was relayed to 95 cable systems in six Southeastern U.S. states, with an estimated reach of 440,000 households. Still, many places were located far enough away from the signal of an independent television station that this was not an option. There were cable systems that carried three stations affiliated with each of the major commercial networks and three PBS stations (one station from within the home market and two stations from neighboring markets of each network).

To serve such areas lacking an independent station, Ted Turner decided to negotiate an agreement with Tulsa, Oklahoma-based Southern Satellite Systems (SSS)—a common-carry uplink firm founded by Turner Communications, which divested the firm to Edward L. Taylor (a former vice president of marketing at Western Union) for $1 in December 1975 to comply with FCC rules prohibiting a common carrier from having involvement in program origination—to uplink the WTCG signal to the Satcom 1 communications satellite to distribute the station's programming to cable and C-band satellite subscribers throughout the United States. With this move, WTCG would become one of the first television stations, and only the second U.S. broadcaster—following premium cable network Home Box Office (HBO) (an eventual sister property to channel 17 as a result of Time Warner's 1996 acquisition of the Turner Broadcasting System), which began to transmit its signal nationally via satellite on September 30, 1975—to be transmitted via satellite, instead of the then-standard method of using microwave relay to distribute a programming feed.

At 1:00 p.m. Eastern Time on December 17, 1976, WTCG became America's first "superstation"—independent stations distributed to cable providers throughout their respective regions, or the entire country—when its signal was beamed via Satcom 1 to four cable television providers in the Midwestern and Southeastern United States: Multi-Vue TV's Grand Island, Nebraska, system; Hampton Roads Cablevision in Newport News, Virginia; Troy Cablevision in Troy, Alabama, and Newton Cable TV in Newton, Kansas. All four cable systems started receiving Deep Waters, a 1948 drama film starring Dana Andrews and Cesar Romero, which was already airing in progress for 30 minutes on channel 17 in Atlanta.

Instantly, WTCG increased its available viewing audience by 24,000 additional households, a reach which already included 675,000 households in metropolitan Atlanta and existing subscribers who received the station in Georgia and adjacent states. That number would grow in the next several years, with the first heaviest concentrations in the Southern United States (where WTCG's telecasts of Atlanta Braves baseball and professional wrestling were highly popular), with its cable coverage eventually encompassing the nation. SSS initially charged prospective cable systems 10 cents per subscriber to receive the WTCG signal as a 24-hour-a-day service and 2 cents per subscriber to receive it as an overnight-only timeshare feed (for transmission over a cable channel otherwise assigned to a local or out-of-market broadcast station, to fill airtime during the occupying station's normal sign-off period). The station, and Turner's innovation, pioneered the distribution of broadcast television stations via satellite transmission to pay television subscribers nationwide, leading United Video Inc. and Eastern Microwave Inc., respectively, to uplink fellow independent stations WGN-TV in Chicago and WOR-TV in New York City (now MyNetworkTV owned-and-operated station WWOR-TV in Secaucus, New Jersey) to satellite for distribution as national superstations by the spring of 1979. Eventually, other independent stations such as KTVU (now a Fox owned-and-operated station) in San Francisco, KTVT (now a CBS owned-and-operated station) in Dallas–Fort Worth, WPIX (now a CW affiliate) in New York City and KTLA (now a CW affiliate) in Los Angeles were uplinked to satellite as well, with their distribution either being purposefully limited to a regional basis or intended for national distribution only to have its reach concentrated primarily within their home regions.

Turner's move to uplink WTCG to satellite also signaled the start of the basic cable revolution, inspiring the concept of cable-originated channels that were available to subscribers without an additional fee including, among others in the early days of basic cable, the CBN Satellite Network (now Freeform), the "original" Madison Square Garden Network (now USA Network), the Alpha Repertory Television Service (ARTS; now A&E), Nickelodeon and ESPN as well as Turner's later cable programming ventures, including Cable News Network (CNN), CNN2 (later Headline News and now HLN), Turner Network Television (TNT), Cartoon Network and Turner Classic Movies (TCM). By 1978, WTCG was carried by cable providers in all 50 states, many of which lacked access to a local commercial independent station and, in some cases, even a distant one. Programming stayed pretty similar as shows such as The Brady Bunch, The Beverly Hillbillies, Bewitched, I Dream of Jeannie, Hogan's Heroes, made-for-TV Popeye cartoons and other vintage shows would be purchased second and even third hand; All in the Family and Sanford and Son, however, were bid for and acquired by WTCG.

Management with Turner and Channel 17 treated WTCG as an "active" superstation; Turner directly asserted national promotional responsibilities for the station, made investments in programming, and charged both national and local advertising rates. This resulted in the station paying for syndicated programs at (albeit reasonably cheaper) rates comparable to other national networks, rather than merely receiving royalty payments from cable systems for programs to which it held the copyright as "passive" superstations—like WGN and WOR, which opted to take a neutral position on their national distribution and left national promotional duties to the satellite carriers that retransmitted their signals and, comparatively, had their signals redistributed without their owner's express permission under a provision in Section 111 of the Copyright Act of 1976—did. Initially, WTCG was identified as "Channel 17" or "Super 17" both locally in Atlanta and on cable providers outside of that area; by 1979, the station identified primarily by its call letters locally and nationally. By 1978, WTCG was carried on cable providers in all 50 U.S. states, reaching over 2.3 million subscribers.

As WTBS

In May 1979, Turner reached an agreement to acquire the WTBS call letters used by the Cambridge, Massachusetts-based educational FM radio station owned by the Massachusetts Institute of Technology (MIT), with the intent of reassigning the callsign to Turner's Atlanta television station. The request was made in conjunction with a $25,000 donation by Turner to a group associated with MIT to fund a new transmitter for the radio station (now known as WMBR), which would include an additional $25,000 pledge to the group if Turner Communications became successful in obtaining the WTBS calls from the FCC. Channel 17 changed its call letters to WTBS—for the Turner Broadcasting System, which its parent company had been renamed in accordance with the callsign change—on August 27, 1979; the station concurrently began branding as "SuperStation WTBS" on a limited basis. By July 1979, WTCG/WTBS was available to 1,000 cable systems throughout the United States, with a total of 4.8 million cable subscribers receiving the signal.

In 1981, Turner decided to have all of the shows carried by WTBS continue to air both locally and nationally, but separated the feeds (in a move that preceded United Video implementing this practice for the national version of WGN-TV after the FCC reinstituted the syndication exclusivity rights rule in January 1990). As a result, local commercials airing on channel 17 in Atlanta were substituted with separate national advertising, direct response ads or public service announcements over the satellite feed. Among the programming efforts WTBS made during this period was Night Tracks, a late-night music video block that aired weekends on the station from 1983 to 1992; the program aired in the form of two three-hour-long video blocks (later reduced to two two-hour blocks in August 1989, and then to two 90-minute blocks in the spring of 1990), barring preemptions from sporting events running overtime. Other original programs shown on WTBS during the 1980s included Tush (a late night sketch comedy and variety series hosted and developed by comedian Bill Tush that ran from 1980 to 1982), Starcade (an arcade-themed game show that ran from 1982 to 1983, with a further run through Turner Program Services in syndication until 1984), The Catlins (a Dynasty-style prime time soap opera which ran from 1983 to 1985), and The New Leave It To Beaver (a continuation of the Leave it to Beaver revival series originally aired on The Disney Channel as Still the Beaver that ran on WTBS from 1986 to 1989).

During the 1980s, WTBS featured a heavy schedule of movies—airing two film presentations during the daytime hours each weekday, and a largely movie-exclusive schedule during the nighttime hours after 8:00 p.m. Eastern Time as well as on weekends from late morning to overnight (with exceptions made for scheduled sporting events, specials, original programs and, in the case of Sunday nights, off-network syndicated series and paid programming). In 1986, Ted Turner purchased the Metro-Goldwyn-Mayer (MGM) film studio and co-owned United Artists (UA) for $1.5 billion. However, the debt that Turner Entertainment incurred from the purchase forced Turner to subsequently sell the studios back to previous owner Kirk Kerkorian that October, in exchange for retaining ownership of the entire MGM/UA film library (including certain acquisitions by MGM). As a result, WTBS acquired the rights to feature films released by the MGM and UA studios for its movie inventory as well as the rights to many theatrical cartoon shorts such as Tom & Jerry and comedy and drama series such as Gilligan's Island and CHiPs for its daily schedule.

By 1987, WTBS was available to 41.6 million households with a cable or satellite subscription nationwide. On September 7, 1987, the "W" in the station's call letters was dropped from the "SuperStation WTBS" branding outside of Atlanta to emphasize the channel's national programming prominence. Within the Atlanta market, through the early 1990s, station promos and digital on-screen graphics referred to the station as "TBS 17". The "SuperStation" branding was dropped entirely on September 10, 1990, in accordance with the national feed's discontinuance of the moniker; for a short time in the late 1990s, in concurrence with the restoration of the sub-brand on the national feed, the "Superstation" brand returned to WTBS—under the "Superstation 17" moniker—without the "TBS" branding.

On September 22, 1995, Time Warner—a New York City-based media company formed in 1989 through the merger of Time Inc. and Warner Bros. corporate parent Warner Communications—reached an agreement to acquire the Turner Broadcasting System and its associated properties (including WTBS/TBS, CNN, TNT, Headline News and Cartoon Network as well as Turner Entertainment) for $7.5 billion; the deal would also expand Time Warner's cable television holdings, as it had owned HBO and sister premium service Cinemax as well as cable television provider Time Warner Cable since the Time-Warner Communications merger six years prior. (Time Warner and predecessor Warner Communications had owned an 18% interest in Turner Broadcasting since 1987, as part of a cable television industry-backed bailout of the company amid severe financial issues.) Under the terms, Turner would acquire an approximate 10% interest in Time Warner as well as oversee its cable network group—comprising the Turner and Home Box Office units and its minority interests in Comedy Central and E!—and hold a position on the company's board of directors (which he retained until he stepped down from the company in February 2006) upon the merger's closure. The merger received regulatory approval on September 12, 1996; the Turner–Time Warner deal was finalized one month later on October 10, forming what at the time was the largest media company in the world.

On December 17, 1997, Time Warner purchased Southern Satellite Systems from Liberty Media for $213 million in cash, as part of a purchase option that Time Warner chose to exercise on September 16. Time Warner held out on an option to acquire SSS through a common stock buyout and instead chose a cash payment citing the "strong overall financial performance of its businesses and its belief that its stock remains undervalued" in spite of price appreciation having been appreciated. The purchase gave Time Warner control over uplink responsibilities for TBS/WTBS.

In September 1998, due to the trend of children's programs migrating more toward cable channels such as Turner's Cartoon Network, WTBS dropped animated series and cartoon shorts from its schedule entirely, leaving a weekday daytime and weekend morning schedule comprised strictly of feature films, sitcoms from the 1980s and 1990s, and a few drama series. As the 1990s and 2000s wore on, the station began to more closely resemble a basic cable channel than a superstation. Outside of Braves baseball, the only Atlanta-centric programming seen on WTBS by 2002 was a pair of weekend morning public affairs shows that were only broadcast over WTBS, and were replaced on the national feed by acquired television series. In September 2003, WTBS dropped a large proportion of dramatic films from its feature film slate and all of its acquired drama series, in an effort to refocus the schedule around comedy programming, consisting of comedy films and sitcoms from the 1990s. (This occurred three years after sister network TNT had altered its schedule to specialize in drama programs.)

Transition to Peachtree TV
As WTBS shifted its programming philosophy, it was eventually determined that the station should be split up into two separate entities. The national cable channel would be known as TBS, while the Atlanta broadcast station would retain a commercial independent format that also focused on sitcoms, as well as other movies and local interest programs. On October 1, 2007, Turner Broadcasting changed the station's call letters to WPCH-TV, and rebranded it as "Peachtree TV". The WPCH call letters had already been used by an unrelated AM radio station in West Point (owned by iHeartMedia, then known as Clear Channel Communications) on 1310 AM; the calls had previously been used in Atlanta by the present-day WUBL (94.9 FM, which accordingly was branded as "Peach 94.9") from 1972 to 2002. Outside of the Atlanta area, the calls had been used by the Augusta radio station now known as WNRR (1380 AM) from 2003 to 2006, and then in the Macon area by the present-day WIHB-FM (96.5) from 2006 to 2015; all three of which are also owned by iHeartMedia. Probably the first use of the WPCH call letters was by a radio station in New York City which operated from November 6, 1926, to June 4, 1933; the station was created as a merger of two earlier stations, WFBH and WRW, under the ownership of Concourse Radio Corporation; it was bought by the owners of WMCA in the fall of 1927 and was merged into that station six years later.

As a result of the separation of channel 17 from the national feed, the national version of TBS became available to cable and satellite viewers in the Atlanta market—including Comcast and Time Warner Cable systems within metro Atlanta—for the first time. (Simultaneous to this, the national TBS network would begin broadcasting MLB games featuring all teams, not just the Braves, and the League Division and Championship Series.) WPCH-TV carries classic and more recent off-network syndicated programming and movies. The relaunched station contains significantly more paid programming, programs targeted at an African American audience, and older, less expensive programming than its predecessor WTBS. Channel 17 also continued to carry Atlanta Braves baseball games until 2012, when all Braves games became cable-exclusive within the market via regional sports networks Fox Sports South (now Bally Sports South) and SportSouth (later Fox Sports Southeast, now Bally Sports Southeast), following a two-year arrangement with Fox Sports South in which it assumed production responsibilities for the station's 45 annual Atlanta Braves broadcasts from Turner Sports.

On January 18, 2011, Turner Broadcasting/Time Warner announced it would enter into a local marketing agreement with Des Moines, Iowa-based Meredith Corporation, under which Turner/Time Warner would retain ownership of the broadcast license while Meredith would assume responsibility for advertising sales, marketing and promotional services and technical operations for WPCH under the purview of CBS affiliate WGCL-TV (which Meredith had purchased in August 1998 in concurrence with longtime owner Tribune Broadcasting's full acquisition of then-WATL-owner Qwest Broadcasting). Channel 17 subsequently migrated its operations from the Techwood Drive facility into WGCL's studio building on 14th Street Northwest in Atlanta's Atlantic Station district. This management agreement with Meredith apparently also ended Turner Broadcasting's yearly sponsorship of Piedmont Park's "Screen on the Green" beginning in 2011.

Outright sale to Meredith
On October 22, 2016, AT&T announced an offer to acquire Time Warner for $108.7 billion, including debt it would assume from the latter; the merger would bring Time Warner's various media properties, including TBS, under the same corporate umbrella as AT&T's telecommunications holdings, including satellite provider DirecTV. WPCH was among the very few Time Warner properties licensed by the FCC, as cable channels like CNN and broadcast television networks like The CW—the latter of which operated as a joint venture with CBS Corporation, which transferred its share to successor ViacomCBS (now Paramount Global) in 2019—are not directly licensed by the FCC (though another wrinkle in the deal involved the company's send/receive satellite dishes, which were Time Warner-owned and licensed by the FCC and were reviewed as part of AT&T's existing infrastructure under the agency's overview of the merger). In the announcement, the companies said they were still determining which, if any, of Time Warner's FCC licenses would be assumed by AT&T.

Media analysts suggested that WPCH was likely to be spun off or sold to a third party to potentially avoid an FCC review entirely, in an effort to expedite the AT&T–Time Warner merger. On February 20, 2017, Meredith announced that it would acquire the license assets of WPCH-TV from the Turner Broadcasting System for $70 million. The sale received FCC approval on April 17, 2017, and was finalized four days later on April 21. The TBS cable channel would remain part of Time Warner, which was renamed WarnerMedia upon the merger's June 14, 2018, consummation, following a 1-year-long antitrust battle with the United States Department of Justice that ended with the deal being affirmed by court judgement.

Sale to Gray Television
On May 3, 2021, locally based Gray Television announced its intent to purchase the Meredith Local Media division, including WPCH and WGCL, for $2.7 billion. The sale was completed on December 1. As a result, WPCH and WGCL gained sister stations in nearby markets, including fellow CBS affiliate WTOC-TV in Savannah, CBS affiliate WRDW-TV and NBC affiliate WAGT-CD in Augusta, NBC/ABC affiliate WALB in Albany, ABC affiliate WTVM in Columbus and Fox affiliate WBRC in Birmingham. Gray now owns stations in every Georgia television market, except for Macon and the Georgia portions of the Chattanooga, Tennessee and Jacksonville, Florida markets. WGCL and WPCH also became the second group of locally owned stations in the Atlanta market, joining Cox Media Group-owned WSB-TV, also based in Atlanta, itself headquartered near the inner-ring suburb of Sandy Springs.

In September 2022, Gray Television announced that WPCH and sister station WGCL would begin using Atlanta News First branding for news programming beginning in October 2022.

Programming

Syndicated programming
Syndicated programs broadcast on WPCH-TV include Rachael Ray, Divorce Court, The Big Bang Theory, Modern Family, The King of Queens, Last Man Standing and Young Sheldon, among others.

Sports programming

Major League Baseball

Channel 17 was a longtime broadcaster of Major League Baseball games featuring the Atlanta Braves under former parent Turner Broadcasting's in-house sports production firm, TBS Sports (later renamed Turner Sports). In July 1972, Ted Turner acquired the local television rights to the Braves beginning with the team's 1973 season, assuming the broadcast contract from then-NBC affiliate WSB-TV (now an ABC affiliate), which had carried the franchise's games since the Braves relocated from Milwaukee in 1966. (However, WSB-TV's sister radio station, WSB [750 AM], continued to hold radio broadcast rights to the team's games for several years afterward.) The acquisition of the Braves television rights reversed the standard of MLB franchises designating originating stations, arranging their own regional carrier networks and handling advertising sales for their game telecasts. It was also particularly striking given that WTCG had experienced major profit losses ever since Turner assumed ownership of the station from Rice Broadcasting in 1970; WTCG had only then started to break even in revenue and was just beginning to become more competitive with the Atlanta market's other television stations in terms of viewership. Channel 17 aired an average of 50 Braves games per season over the first year of the contract, increasing to an average of 95 games per season by 1980.

During the 1970s, Turner also syndicated live Braves telecasts to other television stations (mostly major network affiliates, as the region had few independents) throughout Georgia and surrounding states, including Turner-owned NBC affiliate WRET (now WCNC-TV) in Charlotte. Usually, the Sunday afternoon game and one prime time game were distributed to these stations, with mid-week game telecasts airing mainly during the summer, while the major broadcast networks were carrying reruns of their prime time shows, a normal practice among the other MLB teams during that era. Also by the mid-1970s, WTCG had already become available on many cable systems in Georgia, Alabama and South Carolina via microwave relay transmission by the mid-1970s, giving the team even further television exposure to its loyal fanbase in the South.

After Turner uplinked the station's signal via satellite, channel 17's Braves telecasts began airing nationally at the start of the 1977 season. With WTCG reaching a significant cable penetration throughout the Southern U.S. during 1978 and 1979, Turner ceased syndicating the team's game broadcasts and relegated them to the WTCG/WTBS cable feed, making the Braves the first team that did not provide live game coverage to broadcast stations outside of those within the team's home market. Coverage of the Atlanta Braves (which was formerly owned by Ted Turner) was perhaps TBS's signature program, mainly due to its viewer popularity in Georgia and neighboring states. Turner once famously tried to get Andy Messersmith to use his No. 17 jersey to promote Superstation WTBS in its early years (the back of the jersey read, "CHANNEL 17"). The MLB organization immediately stopped Turner from proceeding with this plan due to league regulations barring team jerseys from incorporating advertising other than that of the jersey's manufacturer.

At the 2006 MLB All-Star Game, it was announced that, beginning with the 2007 season, TBS would begin carrying a television package that includes all major league teams as well as rights to the Division Series and one of the two League Championship Series (assuming the rights from Fox and ESPN) and the announcements of the All-Star teams and any possible games to determine division winners and wild card teams (those were also carried previously on ESPN). As part of the contract, Turner Broadcasting agreed to transition its Braves telecasts to air on a regionally-exclusive basis; these changes were the impetus for the station's separation from the TBS national feed and conversion to a standalone independent station in October 2007.

During the 2007 transitional year, TBS aired 70 regular-season Braves games. In 2008, the number of Braves telecasts for that season was reduced to only 45 games and were relegated exclusively to WPCH-TV, with TBS offering only MLB games from other teams around the league; Turner syndicated the WPCH package to other television stations and cable channels for broadcast in the remainder of the Braves' designated market area. The final Braves game to be broadcast on TBS aired on September 30, 2007, with the first divisional playoff game airing the following day on October 1, 2007 (when the TBS/WPCH split occurred). Production of the Braves telecasts was taken over by Fox Sports South after Meredith began operating WPCH-TV, continuing to air 45 games per season. On February 28, 2013, Fox Sports South and SportSouth reached a deal with the Braves to acquire the 45-game package held by WPCH, rendering the team's game telecasts cable-exclusive beginning with the 2013 season and ending the station's 40-year relationship with the Braves.

National Basketball Association

In October 1972, WTCG obtained the broadcast rights to broadcast NBA games involving the Atlanta Hawks (which were also owned by Ted Turner at the time) under a ten-year agreement. WTCG/WTBS and its superstation feed aired an average of 55 Hawks regular season games per season. TBS aired the games nationwide until the telecasts became subjected to NBA blackout restrictions within  of the home team's arena, resulting in many Hawks away games televised by the TBS national feed being unavailable to cable providers within the designated market area of the opposing team. (This restriction was dropped when TNT gained the right to be the exclusive broadcaster of any game that it chose to carry, although it was still subjected to league restrictions first imposed in 1982 that limited the number of games that could air per season on national and regional superstations.)

In the spring of 1984, WTBS reached an agreement with the NBA to broadcast games from league teams other than the Hawks beginning with the 1984–85 season; under the deal, WTBS/TBS maintained a package of approximately 55 regular season NBA games annually, airing them on Tuesday and Friday nights. From 1985 until 1989, WTBS/TBS also televised anywhere from 12 to 20 early round conference playoff games beginning with the 1985 NBA Playoffs as well as the NBA Draft. Under a joint broadcast contract signed between Turner Broadcasting and the NBA in the summer of 1987, the rights to NBA telecasts began to be split between TBS and upstart sister network TNT beginning with the league's 1988–89 season, with TNT assuming rights to the NBA Draft and most NBA regular season and playoff games and TBS's NBA telecasts being relegated to a single game or a double-headers one night per week. In 2001, Turner Sports signed a new television contract with the NBA, in which TNT would become Turner Broadcasting's exclusive rightsholder of NBA telecasts beginning with the 2002–03 season. (ESPN assumed TBS's portion of the league's cable television contract.)

College football

In 1981, WTBS acquired the television rights to broadcast college football games under a special "supplemental" television contract with the National Collegiate Athletic Association (NCAA) beginning with the 1981 season, limited to games which had already not been distributed for national broadcast by other networks. Beginning with the 1982 season, under a $17.6-million deal reached between the NCAA and Turner on January 27 of that year, consisting of live Division I-AA games on Thursday nights and Division I-A games on Saturdays during the fall. With this, the national SuperStation WTBS feed became the first cable channel to broadcast live college football games nationwide. Beginning in 1984, WTBS's college football coverage shifted to primarily focus on games involving teams in the Southeastern Conference (SEC). WTBS/TBS discontinued its college football broadcasts after the 1992 season.

WTBS/TBS resumed college football coverage in 2002 through a sub-licensing agreement with Fox Sports, which allowed the Atlanta station and national superstation feed to carry college football games involving teams in the Big 12 and Pac-10 conferences, to which Fox Sports held the national cable rights; the network usually aired two games per week during the first four seasons of the contract, reduced to a single weekly game during some weeks in the 2006 season. These rights were transferred exclusively to Fox Sports and its regional sports networks beginning with the 2007 season. On July 14, 2016, WPCH announced an agreement with Kennesaw State University to carry a package of Kennesaw State Owls college football games beginning with the 2016 season.

Professional wrestling

Professional wrestling aired on WTCG/WTBS from 1971 to 2001 under several different wrestling promotions. In 1971, the station served as the flagship outlet for the Jim Barnett-owned Georgia Championship Wrestling (GCW), acquiring the local rights to the program from WQXI-TV (now WXIA); the program concurrently began to be recorded in a soundstage at the channel 17's now-former West Peachtree Street studios in Midtown Atlanta. When WTBS became a national superstation in 1976, Georgia Championship Wrestling became the first National Wrestling Alliance (NWA) promotion to maintain a nationally televised broadcast, a move which made many of the NWA's regional promoters unhappy; however, Barnett allayed any issues citing that he was only using Georgia-based wrestlers.

In July 1984, GCW and the promotion's television timeslot rights were acquired by the Vince McMahon-owned World Wrestling Federation (WWF; now the WWE). The replacement show, WWF World Championship Wrestling (later retitled WWF Georgia Championship Wrestling in March 1985), mainly served as a recap of matches that had previously aired on the WWF's main programs, which angered Ted Turner, who hoped that the WWF would hold first-run matches originating from the WTBS studios. The WWF iteration of the show received much lower viewership than its predecessor; this led McMahon to sell the promotion's Saturday night time slot to Jim Crockett Promotions (owned by Charlotte-based wrestling promoter Jim Crockett, Jr.), who assumed production responsibilities for the wrestling program and used the same set. (Crockett's program relocated to a new arena soundstage at the CNN Center in 1988.)

In 1985, Turner acquired the television rights to Mid-South Wrestling (owned by Shreveport-based promoter Bill Watts) as a WWF alternative program. Although Mid-South quickly became the highest-rated program on WTBS, Watts lost out on acquiring the two-hour-long Saturday timeslot occupied by the WWF, when Barnett helped broker a deal that allowed Crockett to buy the slot from McMahon and become the superstation's exclusive wrestling promotion. Through the early 1990s, the wrestling programs and Braves baseball were among basic cable's highest-rated offerings, due to heavy viewership within the Southeastern U.S.

In November 1988, SuperStation TBS/WTBS became the television home of World Championship Wrestling (WCW), which Turner acquired from Jim Crockett Promotions; it carried the weekly show WCW Saturday Night from 1992 to 2000; this was WCW's flagship program for before Monday Nitro launched in 1995 on sister channel TNT. Another WCW show, Thunder, debuted in 1998 on Thursday nights; the program was moved to Wednesdays in 2000, before it was cancelled in 2001 when TBS executive Jamie Kellner determined that wrestling did not fit the demographics of either TBS or TNT and would not be favorable enough to get the "right" advertisers to buy airtime—even though Thunder was the highest-rated show on the channel at the time.

NBA G League
Since the 2019–20 NBA G League season, WPCH has been the broadcast home of the College Park Skyhawks, the NBA G League affiliate of the Atlanta Hawks.

Newscasts

Turner era
In its early years under Turner Broadcasting ownership, along with sports and its superstation status, WTCG also made its name by producing humorous, satirical newscasts. One such program was 17 Update Early in the Morning, which featured the usually straight-faced Bill Tush and Tina Seldin reporting the news in a mostly deadpan fashion, occasionally interacting with the studio crew, and with comedic sideline gags at times by another co-anchor (known as "The Unknown Newsman") wearing a brown paper grocery bag over his head. The newscast, which often contained elements resembling that of a comedic morning drive radio show, aired between late night/early morning movie presentations from 1975 to 1979. Turner discontinued that program after a Congressional investigation took place concerning his fulfillment of FCC public service requirements, several months before Turner would prepare to launch CNN, an all-news channel that would strive to be anything but comedic. Turner reassigned Tush to regular interview programs on WTCG and during the early years of CNN, as well as a self-titled sketch comedy show between 1980 and 1982. Standard, more serious news updates presented by the anchors of 17 Update and other on-staff anchors—under the title NewsWatch—also ran during the day in-between programs.

On July 20, 1980, CNN began producing an hour-long weeknight news program for WTBS; the TBS Evening News—which was originally anchored by David Jensen (who previously served as a host for BBC Radio 1), Kevin Christopher and meteorologist Dallas Raines—usually ran at 10:00 p.m. local time (the airtime sometimes varied depending on the movie or sports presentation that preceded it). Owing to WTBS's national superstation status, rather than focusing on local news, the program focused on national and international news headlines as well as national weather forecasts and sports headlines. The TBS Evening News was cancelled after four years as a result of low ratings due to the frequent programming delays, with the program ending after the July 20, 1984, broadcast. In addition, on July 31, 1980, WTBS also carried a 24-hour simulcast of CNN in place of its regular programming schedule; the simulcast was done in a move to help encourage subscriber demand to force cable systems to begin carrying the cable news channel.

Upon the channel's January 1, 1982, launch, WTBS also carried simulcasts of CNN's sister channel CNN2 (now HLN). The channel's launch was simulcast nationwide on WTBS as well as CNN starting at 11:45 p.m. on December 31, 1981, as a preview for cable providers throughout the U.S. that had not yet reached agreements to carry CNN2. Thereafter, initially to encourage viewers to ask for the network full-time, the station also ran a half-hour simulcast of CNN2/Headline News each morning at 6:00 a.m. in the Atlanta market and at 5:30 a.m. Eastern Time in the rest of the country. (As WPCH-TV, the Atlanta station ran an hour-long simulcast block of HLN's Morning Express daily at 6:00 a.m. until the 2017 sale to Meredith, when it was replaced with a simulcast of WGCL's morning newscast.) CNN2/Headline News also assumed production responsibilities for the TBS NewsWatch segments, which began to be presented by that network's anchors. The Headline News simulcasts as well as the TBS NewsWatch segments were eventually phased out locally and nationally in 1996 following the relaxation of the FCC's public affairs programming requirements.

Meredith/Gray era

On October 16, 2017, WGCL began producing a nightly, hour-long prime time newscast for WPCH, under the title CBS 46 News at 9, which marked the return of a regular newscast to channel 17 (not counting the Headline News simulcasts) since the cancellation of the TBS Evening News 33 years earlier and the first full-length local newscast produced for the station. The program was first anchored by Sharon Reed and Ben Swann, who were accompanied by chief meteorologist Paul Ossmann and meteorologist Ella Dorsey, and sports director Fred Kalil.

Although it maintains somewhat of a traditional format, it also features heavy viewer interactivity, and features a segment in which the newscast's anchors respond to viewer comments on social media. One notable situation occurred on the December 5, 2017, edition of the newscast, in which Reed—who is African American—made an unannounced on-air address about an email sent by a female viewer, who accused Reed—whom the sender referred to as a "niger", spelling the racial slur without a second "g"—of making a racial double standard with regards to a discussion in an earlier newscast about issues of race in the mayoral election between Atlanta city councilwomen Mary Norwood (who is white) and Keisha Lance Bottoms (who is black, and who was elected mayor with 50.4% of the vote). Reed said the viewer mischaracterized what she said in the conversation, affirming that she never suggested white people could not talk about racial issues.

Technical information

Subchannels
The station's ATSC 1.0 channels are carried on the multiplexed digital signals of other Atlanta television stations:

Until 2011, programs seen on WPCH were broadcast in standard definition and were entirely upconverted and shown with pillarboxing, even for movies; the only exceptions were Atlanta Braves and Southeastern Conference college football games, which were broadcast in widescreen and in high definition. On April 3, 2011, the station's telecast of the 1994 movie Forrest Gump was transmitted in 16:9 widescreen without being pillarboxed, and since then much more of the station's programming has been televised in HD.

At the end of January 2009, the station added a digital subchannel on 17.2; by February 5, it was blank, without audio or video, and was soon removed. It was possible for TBS to be broadcast over-the-air along with Peachtree TV; however, the station did not release any information on what it planned to do with the new channel. In September 2017, the 17.2 subchannel returned as a standard-definition simulcast of the main channel, and is currently affiliated with Court TV as of 2021.

Analog-to-digital conversion
WPCH-TV shut down its analog signal, over UHF channel 17, on June 12, 2009, as part of the federally mandated transition from analog to digital television. The station's digital signal remained on its pre-transition UHF channel 20, using PSIP to display WPCH-TV's virtual channel as 17 on digital television receivers.

In 2019, due to FCC auction 1000 and the subsequent repacking of stations on physical UHF channels 38 to 51 into remaining channels 2 to 36, the station was required to change from channel 20 to 31, in turn requiring WPXA-TV (channels 14.x and 47.1) to move from 31 to 16. All but one of the Atlanta stations required to change was supposed to do this on September 6, at the end of the fifth round of repacking; however, the FCC granted an extension to September 11 due to Hurricane Dorian, since about half of the stations in the fifth round are in or adjacent to states that were affected. It is unclear if WPCH's delay was due directly to WPXA's, or whether there was a cascade caused by other stations near the coast delaying their own channel changes. Tuning to one of WPXA's virtual channels after this change actually remapped most ATSC tuners to WPCH's channels now present on the same RF channel 31 (since the embedded digital station ID is usually ignored)—restoring the correct virtual channels for all stations on their new frequencies (and deleting the old ones) required a full re-scan, though some viewers may have lost or gained channels.

The station's digital transmitter is located near North Druid Hills, on a tower shared with several other television and FM radio stations. Its analog transmitter (also known as the Turner Broadcasting tower) was located on a very large lattice tower on the east side of the Downtown Connector, and was dismantled in 2010. This was a condition of its land lease, as it sits on property owned by Comcast, the primary cable television competitor to Time Warner (both as a provider—as Time Warner had formerly owned Time Warner Cable until TWC's spin-off from Time Warner in 2009—and as an owner of cable channels). This quirk of history is explained by the fact that it was originally the site of a different tower for WAGA-TV, when that station was owned by Storer Broadcasting. Storer Cable was sold to a different owner, and eventually was absorbed into Comcast (see the list of Atlanta broadcast stations by location#Towers).

The station's DTV signal on channel 20 was at the maximum allowable power (1,000 kW ERP), whereas its original analog signal was not, nor is its 805-kilowatt license to cover operations on channel 31. Its digital signal is diplexed with Univision owned-and-operated station WUVG (channel 34) into a master broadcast antenna at a separate tower, located at 1800 Briarcliff Road Northeast, in Atlanta's Morningside neighborhood. The station had also applied for an analog backup facility at this location, with a corresponding construction permit dating from its original application in 2003 to transmit from the WATL digital antenna on the same tower. (Several other television stations have their transmitters on this tower, including WUVM-LD [channel 4] and W13DQ-D [channel 45], and possibly WANF. WWWQ [99.7 FM] is now located on this tower, sharing the same antenna with WZGC [92.9 FM]; WKHX-FM [101.5] is slightly lower on the tower, while WRFG [89.3 FM] transmits from much lower on the tower.)

ATSC 3.0 lighthouse

On August 19, 2021, WPCH-TV turned off its ATSC 1.0 signal and activated its ATSC 3.0 transmitter on UHF 31. The station's ATSC 1.0 subchannels were moved to other broadcasters for simulcasting, while WPCH-TV became the host for the new ATSC 3.0 signals of WSB-TV, WAGA-TV, WXIA-TV, WPCH-TV and WGCL-TV.

As for WPCH-TV's subchannels, WPCH 17.1 and 17.4 were moved to sister station WGCL-TV, while 17.2 was moved to WXIA-TV and 17.3 was moved to WSB-TV.

Canadian distribution
WPCH-TV is carried on most Canadian cable, satellite, fiber and IPTV providers, often being carried as part of one of the main specialty channel tiers. The station first became authorized for distribution in Canada in April 1985, when the Canadian Radio-television and Telecommunications Commission (CRTC) approved WTBS and fellow American superstations WGN-TV, WOR-TV and WPIX for carriage by domestic multichannel television providers. Under CRTC linkage rules first implemented in 1983 that include requirements for providers to offer U.S.-based program services in discretionary tiers tied to Canadian services, TBS and other authorized U.S. superstations typically have been received mainly through a subscription to a domestic premium service—such as First Choice (later The Movie Network and now Crave), Moviepix (later The Movie Network Encore and now Starz), Super Channel, Super Écran, Movie Central (the original user of the Superchannel name, now defunct) and Encore Avenue (also now defunct)—although, beginning in late 1997, many cable and satellite providers moved TBS to new tertiary specialty channel tier under a related rule that allows for one superstation of the provider's choice to be carried on a non-premium tier.

Because the CRTC had only approved the Atlanta station's broadcast signal for distribution to cable, satellite and other domestic subscription television providers, following the separation of TBS and WTBS/WPCH in October 2007, Canadian subscribers continued to receive the re-called WPCH-TV rather than its former national feed. The national TBS cable channel—which had been created as a separate national feed in 1981, later to be split off from WTBS in the 1990s and which for a time was carried in place of that station by some Canadian television providers—was technically a separate channel, and had never been formally approved by the CRTC as an eligible-for-carriage foreign channel that could be carried as a substitute for the over-the-air Atlanta station. Indeed, in its notification of WTBS's change of callsign and branding to the CRTC, Turner Broadcasting apparently did not make any request to have the TBS cable channel approved in its place.

Since the "Peachtree TV" rebrand, WPCH has been dropped by select providers due to carriage disputes with Turner, including Vidéotron (which removed the station in 2009 but reinstated it in 2011), Cogeco (which dropped it in 2011), NorthernTel (which dropped it in 2018 in favor of adding racing channel MAVTV), Shaw Cable, Shaw Direct, and EastLink (who all dropped it after April 30, 2020), and Rogers Cable (who dropped it on October 1, 2021). Until the early 2010s, WPCH continued to carry some of the same programs as TBS (albeit at different times), and as a result, some Canadians may have initially perceived Peachtree TV as either a renaming of, or equivalent to, the American TBS service. However, WPCH did not carry flagship TBS programs such as Major League Baseball (both regular season and postseason games) and original series (such as the former talk show Conan), which were instead carried by other Canadian terrestrial and specialty channels (Sportsnet carries the MLB Division and League Championship Series, while Much and CTV carried Conan).

In a deviation from other American superstations available within the country, in which local newscasts are shown as aired by the originating station, the Canadian feed of WPCH does not retransmit the station's WANF-produced newscasts, offering alternate content in its place.

References

External links
 
 Clips of 17 Update Early in the Morning, maintained by former anchor Bill Tush

PCH-TV
ATSC 3.0 television stations
Independent television stations in the United States
Superstations in the United States
Court TV affiliates
Circle (TV network) affiliates
Gray Television
Television channels and stations established in 1967
1967 establishments in Georgia (U.S. state)
National Hockey League over-the-air television broadcasters
Atlanta Chiefs
Former Time Warner subsidiaries
Former Meredith Corporation subsidiaries